Jean Antoine is a French given name. Notable people with the name include:

 Jean-Antoine Alavoine (1778–1834), French architect
 Jean Antoine de Baïf (1532–1589), French poet
 Jean-Antoine Carrel (1829–1891), Italian mountain climber
 Jean-Antoine Chaptal (1756–1832), French chemist, physician and politician
 Jean-Antoine Constantin (1756–1844), French painter
 Jean-Antoine Courbis (1752–1795), French lawyer and revolutionary
 Jean-Antoine Dubois (1765–1848), French Catholic missionary in India
 Jean-Antoine Gleizes (1773–1843), French writer and advocate of vegetarianism
 Jean-Antoine Gros (1740–1790), French painter
 Jean-Antoine Houdon (1741–1828), French neoclassical sculptor
 Jean-Antoine Lépine (1720–1814), French watchmaker
 Jean-Antoine Letronne (1787–1848), French archaeologist
 Jean-Antoine Marbot (1754–1800), French general and politician
 Jean-Antoine Morand (1727–1794), French architect and urban planner
 Jean-Antoine Nollet (1700–1770), French clergyman and physicist 
 Jean-Antoine Panet (1751–1815), Canadian notary, lawyer, judge and political figure
 Jean-Antoine Petipa (1787–1855), French ballet dancer
 Jean-Antoine Romagnesi (1690–1742), French actor and playwright
 Jean-Antoine Roucher (1745–1794), French poet
 Jean-Antoine Verdier (1767–1839), French general
 Jean-Antoine Villemin (1827–1892), French physician
 Jean-Antoine Watteau (1684–1721), French painter

See also 
 Jean Antoine, a former American female professional wrestler
 Jean (male given name)
 Antoine

French masculine given names
Compound given names